Colin Frederick Porter (born November 23, 1975) is a former American professional baseball player.

Drafted by the Astros in the 17th round of the 1998 Major League Baseball Draft, Porter made his major league debut on May 30, 2003. On January 22, 2004, he was claimed off waivers by the St. Louis Cardinals. Porter became a free agent after the season and signed with the New York Yankees on November 18. He was released by the Yankees on July 22, after batting only .181 combined for Double-A and Triple-A. On July 25, he signed with the Arizona Diamondbacks and played for Triple-A Tucson, becoming a free agent after the season.

External links
Baseballcube.com profile

1975 births
Living people
Baseball players from Arizona
Major League Baseball outfielders
Houston Astros players
St. Louis Cardinals players
Auburn Doubledays players
Round Rock Express players
New Orleans Zephyrs players
Memphis Redbirds players
Trenton Thunder players
Columbus Clippers players
Tucson Sidewinders players
Arizona Wildcats baseball players
Anchorage Glacier Pilots players